Tres eran tres is a Spanish television series which was broadcast in Televisión Española from 1972 to 1973 written and directed by Jaime de Armiñán.

Plot
Elena, Paloma and Julia are three sisters who, nevertheless, have lived in separate homes and barely know each other. Their parents broke up when they were child, and Elena stayed with her mother, Paloma with her father, and Julia was sent to a boarding school abroad. For some circumstances the three, already adult, meet to live together in house of Elena, and the series reflects their disagreements, their fights, reconciliations, frustrations and dreams.

Cast 
 Amparo Soler Leal, Elena
 Julieta Serrano, Paloma
 Emma Cohen, Julia
 Lola Gaos, Fuencisla
 Charo López, María
 Yolanda Ríos, Alicia
 José Vivó, Carrasco
 Joaquín Roa, Father

Awards 
 TP de Oro (1973): Emma Cohen as Best national actress

References

1970s Spanish drama television series
1972 Spanish television series debuts
1973 Spanish television series endings
RTVE shows